State Highway 4 (SH 4) is a state highway in Jharkhand, India.

Route 
SH 4 originates from its junction with National Highway 143 and State Highway 4 at Kolebira and passes through Bano, Barajamda, Noamundi and terminates at its junction with National Highway 20 at Haat Gamhariya.

The total length of SH 4 is 112 km.

References 
 

 

State Highways in Jharkhand